Predictive Microbiology is the area of food microbiology where controlling factors in foods and responses of pathogenic and spoilage microorganisms are quantified and modelled by mathematical equations 

It is based on the thesis that microorganisms' growth and environment are reproducible, and can be modeled. Temperature, pH and water activity impact  bacterial behavior. These factors can be changed to control food spoilage.

Models can be used to predict pathogen growth in foods. Models are developed in several steps including design, development, validation, and production of an interface to display results.  Models can be classified attending to their objective in primary models (describing bacterial growth), secondary models (describing factors affecting bacterial growth) or tertiary models (computer software programs)

References

Microbiology
Food safety